Friedrich Carl or Karl may refer to:

 Prince Friedrich Karl of Prussia (1828–1885)
 Prince Friedrich Karl of Prussia (1893–1917), German prince and horse rider
 Friedrich Carl (officer) (1916–2013), German Wehrmacht and Bundeswehr officer
 SMS Friedrich Carl, a German armored cruiser
 Prince Frederick Charles of Hesse, or Friedrich Karl

See also
 
 
 Carl Friedrich (disambiguation)
 Fred Carl (disambiguation)